NCREE may refer to:

National Center for Research on Earthquake Engineering (NCREE)
National Center for Research in Economic Education (NCREE)